The badminton men's singles tournament at the 2006 Asian Games in Doha took place from 5 December to 9 December at Aspire Hall 3.

Schedule
All times are Arabia Standard Time (UTC+03:00)

Results

Final

Top half

Bottom half

References 
Official Website
Asian Games Complete Results

Badminton at the 2006 Asian Games